Angelos Papasterianos (born 11 July 1991) is a Greek professional footballer who plays as a centre back for Super League 2 club Iraklis.

Club career
Papasterianos was raised in Iraklis' academies. He debuted for Iraklis in the club's first and only season in the Football League 2 in a home draw against Apollon Kalamarias on 18 February 2012. His first goal was the equaliser in a home draw against Ethnikos Gazoros in the opening match of the 2012–13 Football League season. In 2014, he moved to Apollon 1926 F.C. but was not used much, so in 2015 he moved to Panargiakos F.C.

Personal life
Papasterianos' is the younger brother of Manolis Papasterianos.

References

External links 
 profile in Iraklis' Official site

Living people
1991 births
Greek footballers
Greek expatriate footballers
Association football defenders
Iraklis Thessaloniki F.C. players
Apollon Pontou FC players
Panargiakos F.C. players
Olympiakos Nicosia players
Kavala F.C. players
Aris Limassol FC players
Football League (Greece) players
Gamma Ethniki players
Cypriot Second Division players
Super League Greece 2 players
Greek expatriate sportspeople in Cyprus
Expatriate footballers in Cyprus
People from Stagira-Akanthos
Footballers from Central Macedonia